"Rock Wit'cha" is the fifth and final single released by Bobby Brown from the album Don't Be Cruel. It is a ballad with two versions of the song. The music video uses the remix version found in the Dance!...Ya Know It! album. It peaked at number seven on the Billboard Hot 100 in late 1989.

Music video
The music video was filmed in Boston. The version of the song used in the music video was the single version of the Quiet Storm remix, rather than the studio album version.

Personnel
 Bobby Brown: lead vocals
 L.A. Reid: drums, percussion
 Babyface: keyboards, Moog bass, background vocals
 Donald Parks: Fairlight synth programming
 After 7: background vocals

Charts

Year-end charts

Certifications

See also
 Rock With You

References

Bobby Brown songs
1989 singles
Contemporary R&B ballads
Songs written by Babyface (musician)
Song recordings produced by Babyface (musician)
1989 songs
MCA Records singles
Music videos directed by Mary Lambert
Songs written by Darnell Bristol
Song recordings produced by L.A. Reid
Pop ballads
Soul ballads
1980s ballads